Joseph Gallegos (born November 28, 1941) is an American politician and a former Democratic member of the Oregon House of Representatives, representing District 30 from 2013 until 2017.

Biography
Gallegos was born in San Antonio, Texas, but raised in Portland, Oregon, where his parents relocated during World War II to work in the city's shipyards. As a young adult, he also worked in the shipyards before serving one year in the U.S. Air Force and three years with the Oregon Air National Guard during the Vietnam War.

After completing his military service, Gallegos earned his BS in psychology and his master's degree in social work from Portland State University, and his PhD from the University of Denver. In 1982, he helped create a minority social work curriculum at the University of Washington before becoming a professor at San Diego State University, where he served on the faculty from 1983 to 1988. From 1990 to 2010, Gallegos served on the board directors of the Catholic Charities in Portland.

Elections
 2012 To challenge incumbent Republican Representative Shawn Lindsay for the District 30 seat, Adriana Canas was unopposed for the May 15, 2012 Democratic Primary, winning with 2,769 votes; after Canas withdrew, Gallegos won the July 21 special election by precinct committee persons to replace her, and won the three-way November 6, 2012 General Election with 12,299 votes (49.4%) against Representative Lindsay and Libertarian candidate Kyle Markley.

References

External links
 Official page at the Oregon Legislative Assembly
 Campaign site
 

1941 births
Living people
Hispanic and Latino American state legislators in Oregon
Democratic Party members of the Oregon House of Representatives
Politicians from Hillsboro, Oregon
Portland State University alumni
Portland State University faculty
University of Denver alumni
21st-century American politicians